Ocotlán Zapotec (San Antonio Ocotlán Zapotec, Ocotlán Oeste Zapotec, Zapoteco del Poniente de Ocotlán) is a Zapotec language of Oaxaca, Mexico.

References

Zapotec languages